Grimsleyville is an unincorporated community in Buchanan County, Virginia, in the United States.

History
A post office was established at Grimsleyville in 1934, and remained in operation until it was discontinued in 1958. The community was named for James Grimsley, who kept a store there.

References

Unincorporated communities in Buchanan County, Virginia
Unincorporated communities in Virginia